Fiszer (archaic feminine: Fiszerowa)  is a Polish-language transliteration of German surname Fischer. Notable people with this surname include:

Franciszek Fiszer (1860-1937), Polish socialite
Stanisław Fiszer (1769–1812), Polish general and Chief of Staff of the Duchy of Warsaw
Wirydianna Fiszerowa (1761-1826), Polish noblewoman and memoirist

Polish-language surnames
Surnames of German origin